The Chief of Defence Intelligence (CDI) is a three-star role within the Australian Defence Force (ADF), responsible for the Defence Intelligence Group. The Minister of Defence, Linda Reynolds announced the creation of the new Defence Intelligence Group under the command of the CDI which brought the Defence Intelligence Organisation (DIO), Australian Geospatial-Intelligence Organisation (AGO) and some other elements together under a single command.

Chiefs of Defence Intelligence
The following list chronologically records those who have held the post of CDI, with rank and honours as at the completion of the individual's term.

See also

 Current senior Australian Defence Organisation personnel

References

Leadership of the Australian Defence Force
Military appointments of Australia